Yavuzköy (also: Yavuz) is a village in the Pazar District, Rize Province, in Black Sea Region of Turkey. Its population is 163 (2021).

History 
According to list of villages in Laz language book (2009), name of the village is Noxlapsu. Most villagers are ethnically Laz. Village was part of Hasköy, before gaining village status.

Geography

References

Villages in Pazar District, Rize
Laz settlements in Turkey